The Tocuyo River is a river of Venezuela. It drains into the Caribbean Sea.

The river drains part of the Lara-Falcón dry forests ecoregion.

See also
List of rivers of Venezuela

References

Rivers of Venezuela